Oliviero Vojak (24 March 1911 – 21 December 1932) was a professional football player in Italy who played as a striker.

Career
Throughout his career, Vojak played for Italian clubs Juventus (1927–31), and Napoli (1931–32), winning the Serie A title with Juventus in 1931.

Personal life
Oliviero's older brother Antonio Vojak was also a striker who played for Juventus and Napoli, and even played for the Italy national football team. To distinguish them, Antonio was known as Vojak I and Oliviero as Vojak II.

Honours
Juventus
 Serie A champion: 1930–31.

See also
Croats of Italy

1911 births
1932 deaths
Sportspeople from Pula
People from Austrian Littoral
Istrian Italian people
Italian people of Croatian descent
Italian footballers
Juventus F.C. players
S.S.C. Napoli players
Serie A players
Association football forwards